Lukino is a village in Shchyokinsky District of Tula Oblast, Russia.

References

Rural localities in Tula Oblast